Actinokineospora is a genus in the phylum Actinomycetota (Bacteria).

Etymology
The name Actinokineospora derives from: Greek noun aktis, aktinos (ἀκτίς, ἀκτῖνος), a beam, ray; Greek v. kineo, to set in motion; Greek feminine gender noun spora (σπορά), seed and in biology a spore; New Latin feminine gender n Actinokineospora, actinomycete bearing zoospores.

Species
The genus contains 11 species (including basonyms and synonyms), namely
 A. alba (Yuan et al. 2010) Nouioui et al. 2018
 A. auranticolor (Otoguro et al. 2003; New Latin noun Aurantium)
 A. baliensis (Lisdiyanti et al. 2010; New Latin feminine gender adjective baliensis, pertaining to Bali, Indonesia, from where the type strain was isolated.)
 A. bangkokensis (Intra et al. 2013)
 A. cianjurensis (Lisdiyanti et al. 2010; New Latin feminine gender adjective cianjurensis, pertaining to Cianjur, West Java, Indonesia, from where the first strains were isolated.)
 A. cibodasensis (Lisdiyanti et al. 2010; New Latin feminine gender adjective cibodasensis, pertaining to Cibodas, West Java, Indonesia, from where the first strains were isolated.)
 A. diospyrosa (Tamura et al. 1995; New Latin feminine gender adjective)
 A. enzanensis (Otoguro et al. 2003; New Latin feminine gender adjective)
 A. fastidiosa ((Henssen et al. 1987) Labeda et al. 2010; Latin feminine gender adjective fastidiosa, disdainful, fastidious.), formerly Amycolatopsis fastidiosa and before that Pseudonocardia fastidiosa
 A. globicatena (Tamura et al. 1995; Latin noun globus)
 A. guangxiensis (Wu and Liu 2015)
 A. inagensis (Tamura et al. 1995; New Latin feminine gender adjective)
 A. iranica (Nikou et al. 2014) Nouioui et al. 2018
 A. riparia (Hasegawa 1988, (Type species of the genus); Latin feminine gender adjective)
 A. mzabensis (Aouiche et al. 2015)
 A. soli (Tang et al. 2012)
 A. spheciospongiae(Kämpfer et al. 2015) 
 A. terrae (Tamura et al. 1995; Latin genitive case noun terrae)

See also
 Bacterial taxonomy
 Microbiology

References

Bacteria genera
Actinomycetota